Black cowboys in the American West accounted for up to an estimated 25% of cowboys "who went up the trail" from the 1860s to 1880s and substantial but unknown percentage in the rest of the ranching industry, estimated to be at least 5000 workers according the latest research. 

Typically former slaves or born into the families of former slaves, many black men had skills in cattle handling and headed West at the end of the Civil War. Though the industry generally treated black men equally to white men in terms of pay and responsibilities, discrimination persisted, though to a lesser extent than in other industries of the time; historian Kenneth Porter (1994) describes the employment composition of trail parties as:

"...A trailherd outfit of about a dozen men would on the average consist of seven or eight whites, including the trail boss, three Negroes—one of whom was probably the cook, while another might be the horse wrangler, and the third would simply be a trail hand—and one or two Mexicans; if a Negro was not the wrangler, then a Mexican often was. Needless to say, this is not the typical trail outfit of popular literature and drama...Negroes occupied all the positions among cattle-industry employees, from the usually lowly wrangler through ordinary hand to top hand and lofty cook. But they were almost never, except in the highly infrequent case of an all-Negro outfit, to be found as ranch or trail boss."

Background
After the Reconstruction of the South after the American Civil War, freed slaves were still denied land ownership and other rights in many states, and about 20,000 Exodusters headed west to Kansas between 1879 and 1884, with smaller migrations to other Western states. Many trained under Mexican vaqueros, cattle-raising Native Americans, or their former masters; they then worked as ranch hands for wages equal to their white counterparts and offering more opportunities than existed for freemen in the South.

Black men, typically former slaves, children of slaves, or working in plantations, and farms would have been exposed to kitchen work and stables as well. As early as 1770, regulations in Louisiana required two slaves to manage 100 head of cattle. White ranchers could even win competitions based on the cow-handling skills of the Black slaves in their possession. In Antebellum Texas, white ranchers referred to white workers as "cow hands," with Black people in the same position referred to with the pejorative "cow boy." Prior to the abolition of slavery, the cattle trade was considered to offer a high degree of relative freedom to slaves, who would be issued guns, often left unaccompanied on horseback for long stretches, and trusted to return.

Free Black cattle drivers drove cattle from Kansas to areas including Atlanta, the Dakotas, and Canada, as well as New Mexico, Arizona, California and Oregon. Some freed slaves remained with their former masters as employees. As these areas became more settled and established more practical transportation networks, the era of migrant cattle ranching came to an end.

Work
Black cowhands were typically assigned to handle horses with poor temperaments and wild behaviors, a career known as horsebreaking. Other people in the cattle trade were trail cooks, which could earn extra money over other cowhands, regardless of race. Trail menus from black chefs included biscuits, sowbelly, beef, molasses, and coffee. Black chefs would also hunt deer and wild turkey between washing and kitchen cleaning duties. Black cowhands were also expected to perform on the trail, and expected to sing or to pack a musical instrument. Others would often serve as bodyguards or money transporters, which has been attributed to the unlikelihood of thieves searching a black man for large sums of money.

Bose Ikard served as Charles Goodnight's banker for many years.  Bill Pickett was credited with inventing bulldogging.

There were also black women cowboys, though their numbers are unknown, as income was provided to a common household rather than to individual women. Women were unlikely to inherit a homestead or continue to work in ranching, as freemen and white ranchers were unlikely to work for a black woman.

Rodeos
Popularized across the United States in 1873 by Buffalo Bill Cody, Wild West shows showcased skills and characters of the Western United States in the form of a traveling performance including rodeo roping, Native American dances, and other acts. Among these traveling shows, African-American cowboy Jesse Stahl was famous for his saddle riding, a defining aspect of rodeos. Racism was common in rodeo competitions, and terms such as "harder to cover" could be used to mask racism in rodeo competitions under the guise that white riders had more difficult horses. Black rodeo riders would be compared to animals, given nicknames reflecting African animals and using animal metaphors not found in descriptions of white rodeo performers. In response to their treatment and Jim Crow laws, Black cowboys formed "soul circuits," later organized as the Southwestern Colored Cowboys' Association, with the largest number of African-American cowboys participated in rural communities along the coast of Texas up to the 1940s.

Discrimination

Social life on the trail could be egalitarian, with white and black cowhands sharing sleeping quarters and even blankets. Though white and black cowhands were social equals on the trail, racist roles would be resumed in the presence of white women.

Traveling trail hands leading a migration of cattle were typically low-paid at the time, though better paid in the northern states. Pay was typically negotiated per run, with large discrepancies between runs and among hires on the same run. Though Mexican ranchers often received less than a third of white hires, little evidence suggests black hires were paid less for this work than their white counterparts. However, black employees may have been worked harder and expected to work longer hours. Evidence suggests that many black cowhands took on additional labor, such as laundry, testing stream water, taking late night guard shifts, and being the first expected to take on rough horses. Despite the existence of many all-black trail outfits, black cowboys rarely attained rank higher than trail cook or chuckwagon. Regardless of ability, black men would be constrained by having to negotiate with white men who might refuse to respect the authority of a black trail leader. Denied opportunities to become a foreman or range manager, many black cowhands would train white counterparts, with others settling land with their own cattle.

Traveling posed its own challenges to integration. Whereas saloons were typically segregated, whites and blacks could meet in the middle, but restaurants were socially regulated. Traveling black men would not be seated in town restaurants where black-only establishments had not been established, requiring black men to order food from the back door. Most black cowhands would purchase food and prepare it for themselves on the trail. Black men were banned outright from brothels, but welcome in gambling halls.

Media and literary portrayals

Black cowboys feature extensively in a semi-biographical 2019 novel by Russ Brown titled Miss Chisum, centred on cattle baron John Chisum's life from 1837, and his fabled relationship with a slave.

The 2022 neo-western science fiction film Nope is about two Black horse-wranglers dealing with an unidentified flying object in Agua Dulce, California.

See also
Compton Cowboys
Oakland Black Cowboy Association
Fletcher Street Urban Riding Club in Philadelphia
New York City Federation of Black Cowboys

Footnotes

Further reading
 Glasrud, Bruce A. and Michael N. Searles (eds.) Black Cowboys in the American West: On the Range, on the Stage, behind the Badge. Norman, OK: University of Oklahoma Press, 2016.